Oh My Dad! is a Philippine situational comedy series broadcast by TV5. Directed by Jeffrey Jeturian, it stars Ian Veneracion in the title role. It premiered on October 24, 2020 on the network's Todo Max Weekend afternoon block. The series concluded on April 24, 2021 with a total of 26 episodes. In June 2021, the show became available on Brightlight Productions programming affiliate ABS-CBN's streaming platform iWantTFC and worldwide via The Filipino Channel. The show also airs its reruns on All TV since January 7, 2023.

Premise
Matthew Balderama (Ian Veneracion), a former PBA player/matinee idol tainted by scandal returns home to the Philippines after a long stint in the United States. To his surprise, his three "children" as a result of his wild love life come knocking at his doorstep, begging for him to take them in. Matthew makes an attempt at juggling sudden fatherhood with romance and fame, taking it one day at a time.

Cast

Lead cast
 Ian Veneracion as Matthew "Matmat" Balderama, an athlete, celebrity, and novice father
 Dimples Romana as Cassandra "Sandra" Bergado-Balderama, Matthew's childhood friend and eventual love interest

Supporting cast
 Sue Ramirez as Mhaddelyn Grace "Lenlen" Balderama, Matthew's middle child from Negros.
 Louise Abuel as Matthew "Theo" Balderama, Jr., the youngest Balderama sibling who is geeky yet caring.
 Adrian Lindayag as Mikhail "Kelly" Macapangyarihan-Balderama, the eldest of the siblings.
 Gloria Diaz as Belinda "Tiyang Bella" Bergado, the gossiping neighbor, aunt to Sandra and Jepoy.
 Ariel Ureta as Lolo Moises Balderama, Matthew's father and grandfather to his three newly-found children.
 Gerry Acao as Benjomin "Benjo" Manalastas, Matthew's best friend and former teammate.
 Fino Herrera as Jefferson "Jepoy" Bergado, Tiyang Bella's nephew and helper, and the object of Kelly and Lenlen's affection

See also
 List of programs aired by TV5 (Philippine TV network)
 List of programs broadcast by Kapamilya Channel
 List of programs broadcast by Kapamilya Online Live
 Kapatid Channel
 The Filipino Channel

References

External links

TV5 (Philippine TV network) original programming
2020 Philippine television series debuts
2021 Philippine television series endings
2020s Philippine television series
Filipino-language television shows
Philippine television sitcoms
Television series by Brightlight Productions